Derek Stewart Bell (born 19 December 1963) is a former professional footballer who played for Newcastle United and, later as a semi-professional, for Gateshead, as a midfielder.

Bell joined Newcastle as an apprentice in 1979, and made four first team appearances (one as a substitute). He sustained a serious knee injury in a reserve match against Manchester United, and, after leaving Newcastle, he played semi‑professional football for Gateshead, while working in Newcastle City Council's housing department. Bell was also manager, director and chairman at Gateshead.

During his time at the Montagu and North Fenham boys football club in the late 1970s, Bell was sexually abused by Newcastle coach George Ormond. When Bell was working with finding homes for refugee children in the late 1990s and saw Ormond lurking, he decided to secretly record a confession from the coach. Bell was among seven former players at Montagu and North Fenham who gave evidence in a 2002 trial of Ormond that led to his conviction on 13 indecency charges. In November 2016, amid the United Kingdom football sexual abuse scandal, Bell waived his right to anonymity and accused Newcastle of attempting a cover-up.

References

Newcastle United F.C. players
1963 births
Living people
English footballers
Footballers from Newcastle upon Tyne
Gateshead F.C. managers
[[Category:Gateshead F.C. players]
Association football midfielders
English football managers

People with post-traumatic stress disorder